The San Marino Football Federation (FSGC) is the governing body of football in San Marino. It organises the San Marino football league (Campionato Sammarinese), a national cup (Coppa Titano), a super cup (Trofeo Federale) and the San Marino national football team. It is based in the city of San Marino. As of December 10, 2020, the FIFA committee recognizes San Marino as the  lowest-ranking team according to the FIFA World Rankings.

The FSGC also helped to create the original incarnation of A.S.D. Victor San Marino, who plays in Eccellenza, the fifth division of the Italian league.

External links
 Official site
San Marino at FIFA site
San Marino at UEFA site

San Marino
Football in San Marino
Futsal in San Marino
Football
Sports organizations established in 1931
1931 establishments in San Marino